Masti  is a 2007 Kannada-language film starring Upendra and Jennifer Kotwal. The film gathered some controversy for its title from fringe Kannada groups.

Cast
Upendra
 Jennifer Kotwal
 Shashi Kumar
 Kota Srinivasa Rao
 Ramesh Bhat
 Umashree
 Ponnambalam
 Kishore
 Pavithra Lokesh
 Mico Nagaraj

Soundtrack
The music was composed by Gurukiran and released by Jhankar Music.

References

External links 
Viggy article
Nowrunning review

2007 films
2000s Kannada-language films
Indian gangster films